Sheffield Ring Road may refer to
Sheffield Inner Ring Road (also known as Sheffield Northern Relief Road)
Sheffield Outer Ring Road
M1, a north–south motorway in England connecting London to Leeds